Royton Cricket Club are an English cricket team, based in Royton in the Metropolitan Borough of Oldham, Greater Manchester. The team has entered teams at every level, for the 2012 season in the Central Lancashire League.

Honours
First Division: 1914, 1980
Second Division: 1934, 1953, 1957
Burton Cup: 1972, 1973 (shared), 1979
Wood Cup : Finalist on ten occasions, but never won it.

External links
Official website
CLL club page

Central Lancashire League cricket clubs
Sport in the Metropolitan Borough of Oldham
Cricket in Greater Manchester